Christian Nana Kouamou (born 6 May 1988, in Douala), known as Nana, is a Cameroonian professional footballer who plays as a defensive midfielder.

References

External links

1988 births
Living people
Footballers from Douala
Cameroonian footballers
Association football midfielders
Liga Portugal 2 players
Segunda Divisão players
S.C. Freamunde players
S.C. Salgueiros players
S.C. Covilhã players
Cameroonian expatriate footballers
Expatriate footballers in Portugal
Expatriate footballers in Luxembourg
Cameroonian expatriate sportspeople in Portugal